Billy Longer is a former Australian rules footballer who played for the Brisbane Lions and St Kilda in the Australian Football League (AFL).

AFL career
Longer was recruited with pick 8 in the 2011 national draft by the Brisbane Lions from the Northern Knights in the TAC Cup under 18s where he played as a ruck. Longer made his debut for Brisbane in round 3 of the 2012 AFL season, against .

After two years and nine senior games with Brisbane, Longer announced that he wanted to return to Melbourne to live near family and friends and sought a trade. There was considerable interest from Melbourne-based clubs Hawthorn and St Kilda. Hawthorn dropped their interest after St Kilda traded their ruckman, Ben McEvoy, for draft picks. Seeing the ruck opening, Longer agreed to be traded to St Kilda. Longer played his first game for St Kilda in round 4 of the 2014 AFL season against the Adelaide Football Club.

After playing 34 out of 44 games in 2014 and 2015, Longer lost his place and form and failed to play a senior game in 2016. He returned to senior football in 2017 and set a new St Kilda club record for hit outs in the 2017 AFL season of 656 at an average of 38.59 from 17 games.

Longer retired at the end of the 2019 season after experiencing concussion issues during the year.

Statistics
 Statistics are correct to the end of the 2017 season

|- style="background-color: #EAEAEA"
! scope="row" style="text-align:center" | 2012
|
| 5 || 5 || 0 || 0 || 21 || 16 || 37 || 11 || 15 || 113 || 0 || 0 || 4.2 || 3.2 || 7.4 || 2.2 || 3 || 22.6 
|-
! scope="row" style="text-align:center" | 2013
|
| 5 || 4 || 0 || 1 || 11 || 17 || 28 || 6 || 13 || 70 || 0 || 0.3 || 2.8 || 4.3 || 7 || 1.5 || 3.3 || 17.5 
|- style="background-color: #EAEAEA"
! scope="row" style="text-align:center" | 2014
|
| 18 || 16 || 1 || 1 || 40 || 76 || 116 || 17 || 63 || 414 || 0.1 || 0.1 || 2.5 || 4.8 || 7.3 || 1 || 3.9 || 25.9 
|-
! scope="row" style="text-align:center" | 2015
|
| 18 || 18 || 1 || 0 || 67 || 100 || 167 || 43 || 48 || 525 || 0.1 || 0 || 3.7 || 5.6 || 9.3 || 2.4 || 2.7 || 29.2 
|- style="background-color: #EAEAEA"
! scope="row" style="text-align:center" | 2016
| 
| 18 || 0 || — || — || — || — || — || — || — || — || — || — || — || — || — || — || — || —
|-
! scope="row" style="text-align:center" | 2017
|
| 18 || 17 || 2 || 2 || 24 || 135 || 159 || 27 || 68 || 656 || 0.1 || 0.1 || 1.4 || 7.9 || 9.4 || 1.6 || 4 || 38.6 
|- class="sortbottom"
! colspan=3| Career
! 60
! 4
! 4
! 163
! 344
! 507
! 104
! 207
! 1778
! 0.1
! 0.1
! 2.7
! 5.7
! 8.5
! 1.7
! 3.5
! 29.6
|-
|}

References

External links

 

1993 births
Living people
St Kilda Football Club players
Brisbane Lions players
Australian rules footballers from Victoria (Australia)
Northern Knights players
Sandringham Football Club players